Bud the Spud is an iconic chip truck in Halifax, Nova Scotia, Canada. In operation since 1977, it is parked outside the Spring Garden Road branch of the Halifax Public Libraries each summer.  It is now located around the corner on Grafton Street, north of Spring Garden Road.  The edge of the library is marked by a low concrete wall, and it is there that most customers sit and eat their fries. The truck sells hand-cut French fries made from Prince Edward Island potatoes, and sourced from one farmer, David Dawson.  It currently offers hot dogs, fish and chips along with French fries and drinks.

The truck was operated by Bud and Nancy True until 2010. The business operates only during the summer months; the Trues spent the rest of the year travelling. In early 2009 the Trues decided to retire and sell the business.  Due to the economic downturn, buyers for the business were unable to obtain financing, and the truck is still being operated by the Trues for another summer. It was purchased in 2010 by Glenn Tait.  He operated the truck until 2015 when it was purchased by Jody LeBlanc who left his job as an instructor at a career college to run the food truck without any prior experience in the food business.

Food critic Calvin Trillin, who summers in Nova Scotia, praised the truck in the New Yorker writing that "some summers, I would catch myself concocting an unlikely errand in Halifax, an hour and three-quarters from where I live, just to get within striking distance of Bud the Spud."

References

Companies based in Halifax, Nova Scotia
Restaurants established in 1977
Restaurants in Nova Scotia
1977 establishments in Nova Scotia